Valkyrie, in comics, may refer to:

Valkyrie, a Golden Age villain and later ally of Airboy published by Hillman Periodicals
Valkyrie (Marvel Comics), two Marvel Comics superheroes
Valkyrior, the group to which the heroine belongs
Valkyrie, revival of the Hillman character, published by Eclipse Comics in their Airboy comics as well as in her own special and mini-series
Comic Valkyrie, a Japanese manga magazines published by Kill Time Communication, Inc.
Valkyries, a story that appeared in 2000 AD

See also
Valkyrie (disambiguation)

References